José Rodrigues Neto (6 December 1949 – 29 April 2019) was a Brazilian football fullback and manager.

During his career (1965–1984) he played for the following Brazilian clubs: Vitória, Flamengo, Fluminense, Botafogo, Internacional, São Cristóvão. He also played in Argentina with Ferro Carril Oeste and Boca Juniors, and closed his career in Hong Kong with Eastern.

He won four Rio de Janeiro State League (1967, 1972, 1974, 1976), two Rio Grande do Sul State League (1981, 1982) and one Guanabara Cup (1970).

For the Brazil national football team he got 11 international caps from July 1972 to June 1978, he did not score any goals, and played four matches in the 1978 FIFA World Cup. Rodrigues Neto was widely desirable due to his ability to utilize both legs. He was able to overcome his adversaries by kicking with both right or left legs

References

External links
 Boca Juniors statistics
 

1949 births
2019 deaths
Brazilian footballers
Brazilian football managers
Afro-Brazilian sportspeople
Association football defenders
Brazilian expatriate footballers
Association football fullbacks
Brazil international footballers
1978 FIFA World Cup players
Expatriate footballers in Argentina
Expatriate footballers in Hong Kong
Campeonato Brasileiro Série A players
Argentine Primera División players
Hong Kong First Division League players
Vitória Futebol Clube (ES) players
CR Flamengo footballers
Fluminense FC players
Botafogo de Futebol e Regatas players
Ferro Carril Oeste footballers
Sport Club Internacional players
Boca Juniors footballers
São Cristóvão de Futebol e Regatas players
South China AA players
Moto Club de São Luís managers
Esporte Clube São Bento managers
Eastern Sports Club footballers